Eugenia Vronskaya (born 1966) is a Russian figurative painter.

Life
Eugenia Vronskaya was born in Socollnic, Moscow, grew up in Russia, before moving to London aged 22.  She now lives in the Scottish Highlands.

Career and work
Vronskaya studied icon painting from the early age of nine. After this she attended the Moscow School of Art (1981–1983), the Moscow University of Art (1983–1989) and the Royal College of Art, London (1991–93) where she was the first Russian student ever to be accepted to the college, taking commissions for portraits to pay the fees for the course.

In 1989 Vronskaya was invited to New York by Anthony Caro to take part in a Triangle Workshop organised by Triangle Arts Trust. Vronskaya said of the workshop "The most exciting thing about Triangle was the feeling that I could do anything".  The workshop afforded Vronskaya the opportunity to experiment with abstract painting, which she continued to work on for some years after returning to London. Vronskaya married and moved to Scotland in the 90s.

Notable exhibitions include 'As others see us: Portraits from the Highlands', a touring exhibition that was shown in the Royal Scottish Academy.

See also
Figurative art

References

External links
 Kilmorack Gallery's website
 exhibition reviews

1966 births
Living people
20th-century Russian painters
21st-century Russian painters
Alumni of the Royal College of Art
Artists from Moscow